Patania characteristica is a moth in the family Crambidae. It was described by Warren in 1896. It is found in India (Meghalaya).

References

Moths described in 1896
Moths of Asia
Spilomelinae
Taxa named by William Warren (entomologist)